Csonkamindszent is a village in Baranya county, Hungary.

External links 
 Street map 

Populated places in Baranya County